Nabina Lama is a Nepali communist politician and a member of the House of Representatives of the federal parliament of Nepal. She was elected under the proportional representation system from CPN UML, filling the reserved seat for women and indigenous groups.

In 2016, she was elected to the chair of All Nepal National Free Students Union (ANNFSU), the student wing of CPN UML, for a term of two years.

References

Living people
21st-century Nepalese women politicians
21st-century Nepalese politicians
Communist Party of Nepal (Unified Marxist–Leninist) politicians
Nepal Communist Party (NCP) politicians
Student politics
Place of birth missing (living people)
Nepal MPs 2017–2022
1983 births